The PalaRadi (officially , formerly known as Palasport Ca' de Somenzi) is an indoor arena located in Cremona, Italy. The capacity of the arena is 3,519 people and it opened in 1980. It is the home of Vanoli Cremona of the Lega Basket Serie A and Pomì Casalmaggiore of the Women's volleyball Serie A1. The venue capacity was first increased in the eighties to 2,918 spectators, and then to 3,519 after a second renovation in 2009, in which the arena was also renamed after Mario Radi.

References

Indoor arenas in Italy
Basketball venues in Italy
Volleyball venues in Italy
Buildings and structures in Cremona
Sports venues in Lombardy